For information on all Lamar University sports, see Lamar Cardinals and Lady Cardinals

The 2018–19 Lamar Cardinals basketball team represented Lamar University during the 2018–19 NCAA Division I men's basketball season. The Cardinals were led by fifth-year head coach Tic Price and played their home games at the Montagne Center in Beaumont, Texas as members of the Southland Conference.

The Cardinals finished conference play with as 12–6 record in a three-way tie with New Orleans and Southeastern Louisiana for third place.  The team qualified for the 2019 Southland Conference men's basketball tournament as the fifth seeded team.  They won the first-round game against eighth seed Houston Baptist by a score of 81–79. The season ended when the Cardinals were eliminated in the second round by fourth seed New Orleans with a score of 72–76.

Previous season
The Cardinals finished the 2017–18 season 19–14, 11–7 in Southland play to finish in a tie for fifth place. They lost in the first round of the Southland tournament to Central Arkansas. They were invited to the CollegeInsider.com Tournament where they lost in the first round to UTSA.

Offseason

Coaching changes
Justin Bailey, assistant basketball coach at Lamar from 2016–2018, accepted the head coach position at University of Arkansas–Fort Smith.
David Dumars joined the Lamar Cardinals basketball staff as assistant coach on August 20, 2018.  Dumars had been assistant coach / associate head coach on the McNeese State Cowboys basketball staff from 2002–2018.

Departures

Sources:

Player additions
Three players signed letters of intent during the early signing period.  Christian Barrett, a transfer, played at Jacksonville College.  Barrett will play forward.  Davion Buster and Gehlon Easter were high school recruits.  Both will play guard.  Another transfer, Edwin Jeudy, was announced on March 17, 2018.  Jeudy will be transferring from Gillette College.  He was ranked number 78 in the 2018 Junior College Basketball Top 100 Player Rankings.

Incoming transfers

2018–19 recruiting class
Source:

Roster 
Sources:

TV and radio media

All Lamar games will be broadcast on KLVI, also known as News Talk 560.

Live video of all home games (except those picked up by Southland Conference TV agreements) will be streamed on ESPN3.

Schedule and results
Sources:

|-
!colspan=12 style=| Non-conference regular season

|-
!colspan=12 style=| Southland Conference regular season

|-
!colspan=12 style=| Southland tournament

Awards and honors

Player of the week
 Dec. 27 – Nick Garth
 Feb. 4  – Christian Barrett
 Feb. 18 – Nick Garth
 Mar. 4  – Nick Garth

SLC All-Conference Team
Source:
 First team - Nick Garth
 Second team - Josh Nzeakor

SLC tournament team
Josh Nzeakor was named to the SLC Tournament team.

See also 
2018–19 Lamar Lady Cardinals basketball team

References

Lamar Cardinals basketball seasons
Lamar
Lamar Cardinals basketball
Lamar Cardinals basketball